Gamgee Tissue is a surgical dressing invented by Dr. Joseph Sampson Gamgee in Birmingham, England, in 1880.

Gamgee Tissue has a thick layer of absorbent cotton wool between two layers of absorbent gauze. It represents the first use of cotton wool in a medical context, and was a major advancement in the prevention of infection of surgical wounds. It is still the basis for many modern surgical dressings. The name is a trademark of Robinson Healthcare Ltd, based in Worksop, Nottinghamshire, UK and has been since 1911.

Tolkien
In Birmingham, "Gamgee" became the colloquial name for cotton wool, which possibly led to the character name (Sam Gamgee) in J. R. R. Tolkien's The Lord of the Rings.

The connection is not certain: in Appendix F to The Lord of the Rings, Tolkien mentions, but at the same time denies, the reading of Gamgee as a pun relating to the name of Sam's wife, Rosie Cotton.  He further elaborates the 'real' Westron names of which 'Gamgee' and 'Cotton' are translations.

However, in the same section Tolkien also addresses hobbit (which was certainly created first and translated afterward, as described in Tolkien's own comment on the initial writing of The Hobbit) and Brandywine (an obvious English pun on the Elvish Baranduin, 'justified' as translation of a similarly alcoholic pun in Westron).  In this context we may suspect that the Professor is speaking tongue-in-cheek; the Gamgee entry is phrased such that it can be read as a poker-faced, academic way of pointing out that the joke is there, whether or not he intended it.

In a 1954 letter to author Naomi Mitchison, who was proofreading The Lord of the Rings for Tolkien, he addresses several questions she had, including of the Gamgee name:

References
 Absorbent and medicated surgical dressings, J. S. Gamgee, in The Lancet, London, 24 January 1880
 The Lord of the Rings volume III, The Return of the King. Appendix F, part II (page number varies by edition).

Medical dressings